The Mystery of the Open Window is a 1929 mystery detective novel by Anthony Gilbert, the pen name of British writer Lucy Beatrice Malleson.  It is the fourth novel in a series featuring her amateur detective, the politician Scott Egerton. Unlike the rest of the series it was published by Gollancz rather than Collins. It takes the form of a locked room mystery, a popular branch of the genre during the Golden Age of Detective Fiction.

Synopsis
By coincidence, Egerton is at a disreputable inn in Paris when the proprietor is visited by the wealthy Sir Henry Archer, owner of the famous Archer Library, carrying several valuable books with him. Obviously in a state of terror, he demands that his room be locked and his window barred. Nonetheless the following morning he is found in bed, stabbed to death.

References

Bibliography
 Magill, Frank Northen . Critical Survey of Mystery and Detective Fiction: Authors, Volume 2. Salem Press, 1988.
Murphy, Bruce F. The Encyclopedia of Murder and Mystery. Springer, 1999.
 Reilly, John M. Twentieth Century Crime & Mystery Writers. Springer, 2015.

1929 British novels
British mystery novels
British thriller novels
Novels by Anthony Gilbert
Novels set in Paris
British detective novels
Victor Gollancz Ltd books